The Smithfield Street Bridge is a lenticular truss bridge crossing the Monongahela River in Pittsburgh, Pennsylvania, USA.

The bridge was designed by Gustav Lindenthal, the engineer who later designed the Hell Gate Bridge in New York City. The Smithfield Street Bridge was built between 1881 and 1883, opening for traffic on March 19, 1883. It was widened in 1889 and widened again in 1911. The bridge has been designated a National Historic Civil Engineering Landmark, a National Historic Landmark, and has a Historic Landmark Plaque from the Pittsburgh History and Landmarks Foundation.

History

The present bridge is the third bridge at the site and remains the second oldest steel bridge in the United States. In 1818, a wooden bridge was built across the Monongahela by Louis Wernwag at a cost of $102,000. This bridge was destroyed in Pittsburgh's Great Fire of 1845. The second bridge on the site was a wire rope suspension bridge built by John A. Roebling. Increases in both bridge traffic and river traffic eventually made the lightly built bridge with eight short spans inadequate. The present Lindenthal bridge was built in its place, using the Roebling bridge's stone masonry piers.

The Smithfield Street Bridge is the penultimate of the many bridges which span the Monongahela before the river joins with the Allegheny River to form the Ohio River at Downtown Pittsburgh. Only the Fort Pitt Bridge is farther downstream.

The bridge also served the Pittsburgh Railways streetcar system with lines coming from the Mt. Washington Transit Tunnel and from Carson Street crossing the bridge and continuing into downtown along Grant Street and Smithfield Street, returning to the bridge via Wood Street or Grant Street.  The tracks occupied the eastern half of the bridge. The streetcar line was abandoned in July 1985, when the streetcars were diverted to the Panhandle Bridge and the new light rail subway, on July 7.  The last day of streetcar service on downtown Pittsburgh streets and over the Smithfield Street Bridge was July 6, 1985, although the final crossing of the bridge by a streetcar did not take place until 1:40 a.m. on July 7.  The former streetcar right-of-way was then converted into a paved roadway for northbound traffic.

The bridge was listed on the National Register of Historic Places on March 21, 1974. Two years later, on May 11, 1976, it was designated a National Historic Landmark.

The bridge's short clearance from the river as well as its deteriorated condition convinced PennDOT officials to demolish the bridge and to replace it with a modern bridge.  Lobbying by Pittsburgh History and Landmarks Foundation on the merits of preserving the bridge were considered by officials.  In 1994–1995 the bridge was rehabilitated with a new deck, a colorful paint scheme, and architectural lighting.  The abandoned rail lines became an extra traffic lane and there was an addition of a light-controlled bus lane which is activated during peak traffic hours.  The bridge also has the distinction of being the bridge most heavily walked by pedestrians, mostly commuters who park at Station Square.

The bridge connects Smithfield Street in Downtown Pittsburgh with Station Square.

Gallery

Popular culture
The bridge is featured in the 1993 Bruce Willis film Striking Distance, the opening scene of the 1983 film Flashdance and the 2010 rap video Black and Yellow.

See also

List of bridges documented by the Historic American Engineering Record in Pennsylvania
List of crossings of the Monongahela River
Mount Washington Transit Tunnel
Baltimore and Ohio Station (Pittsburgh)

References

External links

Smithfield Street Bridge on pghbridges.com
American Society of Civil Engineers on Smithfield Street Bridge
Historical photos of the bridge from the Carnegie Library of Pittsburgh
A collection of contemporary photos of the bridge
 
 

Bridges in Pittsburgh
Bridges over the Monongahela River
Lenticular truss bridges in the United States
Road bridges on the National Register of Historic Places in Pennsylvania
National Historic Landmarks in Pennsylvania
Bridges completed in 1883
Towers in Pennsylvania
City of Pittsburgh historic designations
Pittsburgh History & Landmarks Foundation Historic Landmarks
Historic Civil Engineering Landmarks
Historic American Engineering Record in Pennsylvania
Railroad-related National Historic Landmarks
National Register of Historic Places in Pittsburgh
Steel bridges in the United States